Zoë Sprengers (born 19 January 2000) is a Dutch handballer who plays as left wing for Borussia Dortmund and the Dutch National Women’s team.

Achievements
Junior European Championship
: 2019
 European Youth Beach Handball Championship
: 2016
 Eredivisie
: 2017, 2018, 2019

Awards and recognition
 EHF Youth European Championship Top Scorer: 2017
 All-Star Team Best Left Wing of the Junior European Championship: 2019

References

2000 births
Living people
People from Heemskerk
Dutch female handball players
Dutch expatriate sportspeople in Germany
Expatriate handball players
Sportspeople from North Holland
21st-century Dutch women